Maulidia Octavia (born 1 October 1991), known professionally as Via Vallen, is an Indonesian dangdut singer. Her stage name, "Vallen", is taken from Evanescence's first album Fallen.

Via started a career in singing at the age of 15. Her presence in the Indonesian show-business is often considered similar to Isyana Sarasvati because of the resemblance of her face. Via has a support group of fans from different cities named Vyanisty, inaugurated on 24 September 2010. Her solo career began with the release of her first single "Selingkuh" in early 2015. Her single "Sayang" is her most popular song, having reach more than 100 million views on YouTube, making it as the second most viewed Indonesian music video of 2017. Via is also a dangdut singer who sang the theme song for the 2018 Asian Games, "Meraih Bintang" (lit. "Reach for The Stars").

Background
Via Vallen is a dangdut singer from East Java who has been known as a national artist. Via is also successful in bringing the genre of koplo and earned the nickname "Pop Queen Koplo" because the pop songs are sung in the rhythm of dangdut koplo along with a number of famous dangdut music groups such as New Pallapa, SERA, Monata and others. Her work became more widely known when a number of national television stations invited her to become a guest star on the Inbox SCTV Carnival.

Via has been invited to the 2016 Anugerah Dangdut Indonesia MNCTV award ceremony, and has performed with a number of famous artists such as Dewi Persik, Zaskia Gotik, Raffi Ahmad, Soimah Pancawati and others.

In addition to having fans named Vyanisty, Via Vallen is herself a fan of Beyonce and Mariah Carey. Via claimed not to love dangdut as a teenager, preferring pop rock music including that by the American rock band Evanescence, and singer Avril Lavigne.

Her stage name Vallen is taken from the first album Evanescence titled Fallen. Via Vallen joined Sera, an Indonesian dangdut band, in 2008. She appeared in televised concerts in Hong Kong and China in 2016.

Via's maternal family are from Bandung and Aceh. Via started her career in entertainment in second grade of junior high school. Since 5th grade she attended gigs as a trainee singer, with her father who is himself a dangdut musician.

Via released her first single entitled "Selingkuh" in 2015. Next she issued singles such as "Secawan Madu", "Sayang", "Sakit Sakit Hatiku", "Baper", "Peternak Luka", and many more, and her first album titled The Names was released in 2016.

Via Vallen won the 2017 SCTV Music Awards Most Popular Dangdut Singer category, winning this award against competition from a number of famous dangdut singers. Via also received the Most Popular Female Dangdut Singer in Indonesian Dangdut Award (IDA) 2017 and also get award from DWP (Dangdut Wilayah Pantura) for Best Singer ter-WP.

In 2018, she performed the 2018 Asian Games official theme song "Meraih Bintang", a pop dangdut song written by Parlin Burman "Pay" Siburian. On 6 July 2018, it was announced that she will perform alongside 107 bands from 30 countries at the International Indie Music Festival at Indonesia Convention Exhibition. The event was held on 27 September to 7 October 2018.

Style
Via does not seek to imitate the style of traditional dangdut singers, instead aims at a more fresh, young, and modern style, a shared characteristic of Korean women or the Japanese Harajuku style.

Personal life
Via Vallen has been harassed by a famous footballer based in Indonesia via an Instagram direct message. She shared her harassment conversation with the footballer on Instagram and told him to stay away from her. She did not disclose the account that harassed her, but some reports and evidences said that the account belonged to Persija player Marko Šimić. She is a fans club of Manchester United.

Discography

Studio albums

Compilation albums

Singles

Awards and nominations

References

External links
 Via Vallen on Ascada Musik Indonesia (in Indonesian)
 Via Vallen discography on iTunes

Living people
Indonesian Muslims
21st-century Indonesian women singers
Indonesian dangdut singers
Indonesian film actresses
Indonesian television actresses
1991 births